Barclay Farm House, also known as Barclay Farmstead, is located in Cherry Hill, Camden County, New Jersey, United States. The house was built in 1816 and was added to the National Register of Historic Places on January 26, 1978.

History
The house is owned and operated by Cherry Hill Township as an early 19th-century house with living history programs.

The Barclay Farm home is open for tours throughout the year, and is the site of special events in the summer months, such as weekly outdoor concerts. At Christmas time, the home is decorated and hosts winter events, including an annual craft fair.

The Barclay Farmstead Museum is open to the public on Wednesdays from 12:00 to 4:00 p.m. and the first Sunday of each month from 1:00 to 4:00 p.m. (March to November).  Calling is recommended before a visit.

The immediate area surrounding the farm house has marked light hiking trails, a playground and a number of vegetable gardens, cared for by area residents who rent space during the summer to grow produce.

See also
National Register of Historic Places listings in Camden County, New Jersey

References

External links

Houses on the National Register of Historic Places in New Jersey
Federal architecture in New Jersey
Houses completed in 1828
Houses in Camden County, New Jersey
Museums in Camden County, New Jersey
Historic house museums in New Jersey
Living museums in New Jersey
Cherry Hill, New Jersey
National Register of Historic Places in Camden County, New Jersey
New Jersey Register of Historic Places